The Hypocrites (Los hipócritas) is a 1965 Argentine crime film directed by Enrique Carreras to a script by Sixto Pondal Ríos.

Cast
  Tita Merello as Marga Albanese
  Jorge Salcedo as Dr. Eugenio Laborda
  Sergio Renán as Bubby
  Walter Vidarte as Toño
  Marcela López Rey as Elena Albanese
  Guillermo Battaglia as Comisario
  Darío Víttori as Dr. Massini
  Jacques Arndt
  Estela Molly as Haydée Borello
  Paula Galés as Cantante
   as Sandra
  Elcira Olivera Garcés as Violeta
  Fernando Vegal as Dr. Macetti
  Humberto de la Rosa
  Rodolfo Onetto as Cabo de policía
  Fernando Siro as Fiscal
  Rodolfo Puga
  Rosángela Balbo as Alicia
  Carlos Víctor Andris as Médico
  Rafael Diserio as Sr. Borello
  Josefa Goldar as Sra. Borello
  Hugo Dargó as Silvio
  Fabiana Gavel as Adriana
  Marta Cipriano
  Carlos A. Dussó
  Carlos Bianquet as Diputado
  Roberto Bordoni
  Rafael Chumbita as Policía
  Mónica Linares
  Claudio Lucero as Bachicha
  Aldo Mayo as Periodista
  Susana Beltrán

References

External links
 

1965 films
1960s Spanish-language films
Argentine black-and-white films
Films directed by Enrique Carreras
1960s Argentine films
Argentine crime drama films
1965 crime drama films